Spellsinger (1983) is a fantasy novel by American writer Alan Dean Foster. The book follows the adventures of Jonathan Thomas Meriweather who is transported from our world into a land of talking animals and magic. It is the first in the Spellsinger series.

Plot summary
In a world of sentient animals and humans, the hardheaded tortoise wizard Clothahump searches across the dimensions for another kind of wizard to help defeat the looming threat posed by the armies of the Plated Folk. What he gets is Jonathon Thomas Meriweather, law student, part-time would-be rock guitarist and janitor, who finds that with the use of a unique instrument called a duar, he can perform magic by playing and choosing from his well-worn repertoire of rock. Jon-Tom, as he is called in Clothahump's world, quickly discovers that while he might be able to use magic with his music making, the results are often unpredictable and usually humorous. Ever searching for a way to get back to Earth, Jon-Tom takes up the battle to save this world.

External links

Spellsinger review
Alan Dean Foster homepage

1983 American novels
Novels by Alan Dean Foster
Spellsinger series
American fantasy novels